Simon Patrick Stewart (born January 28, 1980) is a professional coach and retired Shot putter from United States. Now lives in Århus, Denmark.

Coaching career
Technical Coach
Shot put: Trine Mulbjerg, Coach, Elite Center West
Discus, Coach, Elite Center West
Hammer throw, Coach, Elite Center West 

Physical Coach
Bakken Bears basketball.
Martin Kirketerp Olympian gold medalist, 2008 Beijing, 49er class
Danish Archery Federation Elite coach.

Competitive and professional career

References

1980 births
Living people
Danish male shot putters
Idaho Vandals men's track and field athletes
People from Pierre, South Dakota